Twenty Twenty is the eleventh studio album by Irish singer-songwriter Ronan Keating. It was released on 24 July 2020 through Decca Records, after postponement from its announced release on 1 May.

Background
On 12 February 2020, Keating announced the release of his eleventh studio album, titled Twenty Twenty, and its accompanying tour on his programme on Magic Radio. On the following day, he also announced the release and the tour on his Twitter. Twenty Twenty is Keating's first album in four years since Time of My Life (2016), and marks twenty years since the beginning of his solo career. The album has sold 30,000 copies in the UK, 10,000 copies in Australia, 5,000 copies in Germany and 5,000 copies in New Zealand.

Singles
On 13 February 2020, the album's lead single "One of a Kind" was released. On 29 April 2020, the second single "Little Thing Called Love" was released. On 10 July 2020, the third single "Love Will Remain" was released. On 12 February 2021, a cover of Randy Travis' "Forever and Ever, Amen" was released as the album's fourth single.

Track listing

Charts

Release history

References

Ronan Keating albums
2020 albums
Pop albums by Irish artists
Decca Records albums